Colonial Beach High School is a public high school located in Westmoreland County, Virginia, United States. The school has an enrollment of 640 students.  Colonial Beach High School became accredited by the Southern Association of colleges and the Virginia State Board of Education in 2005.

Administration
Jason Sears is the principal of the high school.

References

Public high schools in Virginia
Public middle schools in Virginia
Public elementary schools in Virginia
Schools in Westmoreland County, Virginia